Echinula is a genus of fungi within the Hyaloscyphaceae family. This is a monotypic genus, containing the single species Echinula asteriadiformis.

References

External links
Echinula at Index Fungorum

Hyaloscyphaceae
Monotypic Leotiomycetes genera